Sir (Collingwood) George Clements Hamilton, 1st Baronet (1 November 1877 – 12 January 1947) was an English electrical engineer and Conservative Party politician.

Born in Northumberland, he was the son of a prominent Church of England cleric, the Venerable George Hans Hamilton, Archdeacon of Lindisfarne then Northumberland, Canon of Durham and his wife Lady Louisa Hamilton.

Early career and family
Following education at Aysgarth School and Charterhouse School, he was apprenticed to the firm of Scott & Mountain Ltd, a Newcastle-based electrical and general engineering company. He represented the company in various countries including India, Bulgaria, Greece, Russia and Egypt. He subsequently became the managing director of the Manchester branch of Drake & Gorham, electrical engineers.

He married Eleanor Simon of Didsbury in 1906, and they had one son and one daughter.

War service
During World War I he was commissioned as an officer in the Queen's Westminster Rifles, the 16th Battalion of the London Regiment, rising to the rank of major. In October 1916 he was transferred to the General List. He was appointed Director of Enrolment National Service in 1917 and Controller of Contract Claims at the Ministry of Munitions in 1918.

Political career
From 1910 to 1913 he was a councillor on the Knutsford Urban District Council.

In 1913 he won a by-election and was elected to the Commons as Conservative Member of Parliament (MP) for Altrincham. He served as Parliamentary Private Secretary to the Minister of Pensions from 1919–20. He held the seat until 1923. He returned to parliament at another by-election at Ilford in 1928. He resigned from the House of Commons in 1937.

He was knighted in 1922 Birthday Honours, and made a baronet in the 1937 Coronation Honours "for political and public services".

Later life
Hamilton moved to Cransford Hall, near Saxmundham in Suffolk. He became a member of East Suffolk County Council, and was chairman of two companies: the Expanded Metal Company and the National Group of Fixed Trusts.

He died at Cransford in January 1947, aged 69.

References

Notes

Bibliography

External links 
 
 

1877 births
1947 deaths
Knights Bachelor
Baronets in the Baronetage of the United Kingdom
Conservative Party (UK) MPs for English constituencies
UK MPs 1910–1918
UK MPs 1918–1922
UK MPs 1922–1923
UK MPs 1924–1929
UK MPs 1929–1931
UK MPs 1931–1935
UK MPs 1935–1945
 
People from Northumberland
English electrical engineers
People educated at Aysgarth School
People educated at Charterhouse School
Queen's Westminsters officers
British Army personnel of World War I
British Army General List officers
Members of East Suffolk County Council
Military personnel from Northumberland